BioViva is an American biotechnology company, based in Bainbridge Island, Washington, researching treatments to interfere in the ageing process in humans.

History 
BioViva was founded in 2015. CEO Elizabeth Parrish appeared at WIRED Health 2017 in London to discuss BioViva's testing of gene therapies targeting hallmarks of the ageing process. She stated, "The company was built essentially to prove these therapies work or not. Remember, BioViva is not a research organisation. We are taking things like gene therapies and using them like technology."

Responses to Parrish using herself as first experimental subject 
Parrish's decision to be 'patient zero' and test the company's technology on herself in a personalized N=1 study has been both criticized and lauded. Dr. Lawrence Altman, author of Who Goes First? The Story of Self-Experimentation in Medicine has said, "N's of 1 have had their value through history, and will. But you're not going to license a drug based on an N-of-1." Her treatment, labelled as self-experimentation, was highly controversial. As the requirements to progress to human trials had not started, the US Food and Drug Administration did not authorize Parrish's experiments. Parrish traveled to Colombia for the treatments.

Some have criticized BioViva's release of data claiming an extension of Parrish's leukocyte telomeres following her therapy, stating that the aforementioned extension is within the error change for telomere measurements. Dr. Bradley Johnson, Associate Professor of Pathology and Lab Medicine at the University of Pennsylvania said, "Telomere length measurements typically have low precision, with variation in measurements of around 10 percent, which is in the range of the reported telomere lengthening apparently experienced by Elizabeth Parrish."

Altering the genetic makeup of humans, or gene therapy, by lengthening telomeres has been described as dangerous, as the ageing process is poorly understood. The telomeres' function is to maintain chromosomal integrity and provide a substrate for DNA replication (thereby allowing for cellular multiplication), however, telomere shortening causes shortening of cellular lifetime which helps to avoid cancerous mutations in cells. Duncan Baird, a professor of Cancer and Genetics at Cardiff University's School of Medicine, states, "Meddling with a fundamentally important tumor-suppressive mechanism that has evolved in long-lived species like ours doesn't strike me as a particularly good idea."

Timothy Caulfield, a professor in the Faculty of Law and the School of Public Health at the University of Alberta, characterized BioViva's work as 'pseudoscience' and lacking scientific rigor. George M. Martin, Professor of Pathology at the University of Washington had agreed to be an adviser to the company but resigned upon hearing about Parrish's self-experiments.

Antonio Regalado, a reporter for the MIT Technology Review states, "The experiment seems likely to be remembered as either a new low in medical quackery or, perhaps, the unlikely start of an era in which naive people receive genetic modifications not just to treat disease, but to reverse aging."

Research 
BioViva's research interests are based on preclinical research of both the enzyme telomerase and inhibition of myostatin.

Telomerase gene therapy utilizing an adeno-associated virus at the Spanish National Cancer Research Centre (CNIO), has demonstrated several beneficial effects and an increase in median lifespan of up to 24% in mice. Discussing her team's research, María Blasco stated in discussion with The Scientist, "We demonstrated that AAV9-Tert gene therapy was sufficient to delay age-related pathologies and extend both median and maximum longevity in mice. Many pathologies were delayed, including cancer. Translating these results to human diseases (telomere syndromes or certain age-related diseases without effective treatments) may be of interest in the context of clinical trials approved by the corresponding regulatory agencies." However, some experts draw attention that the results of studies in mice cannot always be directly transferred to humans.

References

External links 
 

Life extension organizations
Life sciences industry
Biotechnology companies of the United States
Biotechnology companies established in 2015
2015 establishments in Washington (state)